Black ghost may refer to:

 Black ghost knifefish, a South American tropical fish
 The Black Ghost, a vigilante in the serial The Last Frontier
 The Black Ghosts, an English electronic music duo
 Ju-On: Black Ghost, a 2009 Japanese horror film
 Black Ghost, an evil organization in the anime Cyborg 009
 The Black Ghost Bandit, a 1915 American silent short Western directed by Tom Ricketts
 The Black Ghosts (short story), a short story written by Chinese author Pu Songling
 The Black Ghost, a 1970 Dodge Challenger R/T SE owned by street racer and Detroit Police Department motorcycle officer Godfrey Qualls, listed on the National Historical Vehicle Register

See also
 Black dog (ghost)
 Ghosts In the Black